Events from the year 1979 in the United States.

Incumbents

Federal government 
 President: Jimmy Carter (D-Georgia)
 Vice President: Walter Mondale (D-Minnesota)
 Chief Justice: Warren E. Burger (Minnesota)
 Speaker of the House of Representatives: Tip O'Neill (D-Massachusetts)
 Senate Majority Leader: Robert Byrd (D-West Virginia)
 Congress: 95th (until January 3), 96th (starting January 3)

Events

January
 January 1 – The United States and the People's Republic of China establish full diplomatic relations.
 January 4 – The State of Ohio agrees to pay $675,000 to families of those who were dead or injured from the Kent State shootings.
 January 9 – The Music for UNICEF Concert is held at the United Nations General Assembly to raise money for UNICEF and promote the Year of the Child. It is broadcast the following day in the United States and around the world. Hosted by The Bee Gees, other performers include Donna Summer, ABBA, Rod Stewart and Earth, Wind & Fire. A soundtrack album is later released.
 January 19 – Former U.S. Attorney General John N. Mitchell is released on parole after 19 months at a federal prison in Alabama.
 January 21 – Super Bowl XIII: The Pittsburgh Steelers defeat the Dallas Cowboys 35–31 at the Miami Orange Bowl in Miami, Florida.
 January 29 – Brenda Ann Spencer opens fire at a school in San Diego, California, killing two faculty members and wounding eight students. Her response to the action, “I don’t like Mondays,” inspired the Boomtown Rats to make a song of the same name.
 January 1 to 31:

February
 February 13 – The intense February 13, 1979 Windstorm strikes western Washington and sinks a 1/2-mile-long section of the Hood Canal Bridge.
 February 14 – In Kabul, Muslim extremists kidnap the American ambassador to Afghanistan, Adolph Dubs, who is later killed during a gunfight between his kidnappers and police.
 February 20 – This Old House premieres on PBS.
 February 26 – A total solar eclipse occurred in North America.
 February 27 – The annual Mardi Gras celebration in New Orleans, Louisiana is canceled due to a strike called by the New Orleans Police Department.
 February 1 to 28 – With a statewide water-equivalent precipitation average of only , this is Alaska’s driest month since records began in 1925, and first driest month since being admitted to statehood in 1959.

March
 March 4 – The U.S. Voyager I space probe photos reveal Jupiter's rings.
 March 25 – The first fully functional Space Shuttle orbiter, Columbia, is delivered to the John F. Kennedy Space Center, to be prepared for its first launch.
 March 26 – In a ceremony at the White House, President Anwar Sadat of Egypt and Prime Minister Menachem Begin of Israel sign the Egyptian–Israeli Peace Treaty.
 March 29 – America's most serious nuclear power plant accident at Three Mile Island, Pennsylvania.

April

 April 1 – Nickelodeon debuts on cable television, playing children's television shows 24 hours a day. Pinwheel, which first premiered on the channel C-3 in 1977, was one of the first shows to be broadcast on the channel.
 April 2 – Major League Baseball umpires go on strike, forcing replacements from the minor leagues, college and high school to be used for the first seven weeks of the season. Union umpires return to work May 18. 
 April 9 – The 51st Academy Awards ceremony, hosted by Johnny Carson, is held at Dorothy Chandler Pavilion in Los Angeles. Michael Cimino's The Deer Hunter wins five awards, including Best Picture and Best Director for Cimino. The film is also tied with Warren Beatty and Buck Henry's Heaven Can Wait in receiving nine nominations each. The ceremony marks the final public appearances of actors Jack Haley and John Wayne; they would both die two months later.
 April 10 – A tornado hits Wichita Falls, Texas, killing 42.
 April 20 – President Jimmy Carter is attacked by a swamp rabbit while fishing in his hometown of Plains, Georgia.
 April 22 – The Albert Einstein Memorial is unveiled at the National Academy of Sciences in Washington, DC.

May
 May – The unemployment rate drops to 5.6%, the low point for the late 1970s business cycle and the lowest since July 1974.
 May 9 – A Unabomber bomb injures Northwestern University graduate student John Harris.
 May 21 
In San Francisco, gay people riot after hearing the verdict for Dan White, assassin of Mayor George Moscone and Supervisor Harvey Milk.
The Montreal Canadiens defeat the New York Rangers 4 games to 1 in the best-of-seven series, winning the Stanley Cup.
 May 25
American Airlines Flight 191: In Chicago, a DC-10 crashes during takeoff at O'Hare International Airport, killing 271 on board and 2 people on the ground. It is the deadliest aviation accident to have occurred in the United States.
John Spenkelink is executed in Florida, in the first use of the electric chair in America after the reintroduction of death penalty in 1976.
Six-year-old Etan Patz disappears in New York City. The incident helps spark the missing children's movement.
 May 27 – Indianapolis 500: Rick Mears wins the race for the first time, and car owner Roger Penske for the second time.

June
 June – McDonald's introduces the Happy Meal, there was no toy as seen from the commercial.
 June 1 – The Seattle SuperSonics win the NBA Championship against the Washington Bullets.
 June 18 – Jimmy Carter and Leonid Brezhnev sign the SALT II agreement in Vienna.
 June 20 – A Nicaraguan National Guard soldier kills ABC TV news correspondent Bill Stewart and his interpreter Juan Espinosa. Other members of the news crew capture the killing on tape.

July
 July 2 – The Susan B. Anthony dollar is introduced in the U.S.
 July 3 – U.S. President Jimmy Carter signs the first directive for secret aid to the opponents of the pro-Soviet regime in Kabul.
 July 8 – Los Angeles passes its gay and lesbian civil rights bill.
 July 11 – NASA's first orbiting space station Skylab begins its return to Earth, after being in orbit for 6 years and 2 months.
 July 12 – A Disco Demolition Night publicity stunt goes awry at Comiskey Park, forcing the Chicago White Sox to forfeit their game against the Detroit Tigers. Local Rock Radio station WLUP attended the event
 July 15 – President Jimmy Carter speaks to Americans about ‘’a crisis of confidence.’’ The speech will come to be known as ‘’the malaise speech,’’ though Carter never used the word ‘’malaise.’’
 July 17 – Nicaraguan dictator General Anastasio Somoza Debayle resigns and flees to Miami, Florida.
 July 19 – The Sandinista National Liberation Front concludes a successful revolutionary campaign against the U.S.-backed Somoza dictatorship and assumes power in Nicaragua.

August
 August 2 – New York Yankees catcher and team captain Thurman Munson is killed in an airplane crash at age 32 during touch-and-go landings in Canton, Ohio. 
 August 6 – The 5.7  Coyote Lake earthquake affected the South Bay and Central Coast areas of California with a maximum Mercalli intensity of VII (Very strong), causing 16 injuries and $500,000 in damage.
 August 9 – Raymond Washington, co-founder of the Crips, today one of the largest, most notorious gangs in the United States, is shot and killed 5 months after his arrest for quadruple murder (his killers have not yet been identified).
 August 10 – Michael Jackson releases his first breakthrough album Off the Wall. It sells 7 million copies in the United States alone, making it a 7x platinum album.
 August 29 – A national referendum is held in which Somali voters approve a new liberal constitution, promulgated by President Siad Barre to placate the United States.

September
 September 1 – The U.S. Pioneer 11 becomes the first spacecraft to visit Saturn, when it passes the planet at a distance of 21,000 km.
 September 12 – Hurricane Frederic makes landfall at 10:00 p.m. on Alabama's Gulf Coast.
 September 16 – The Sugarhill Gang release Rapper's Delight, the first rap single to become a Top 40 hit on the Billboard Hot 100.
 September 23 – The largest anti-nuclear demonstration to date is held in New York City, where almost 200,000 people attend.

October
 October 1–6 – Pope John Paul II visits the United States.
 October 14 – A major gay rights march in the United States takes place in Washington, D.C., involving many tens of thousands of people.
 October 15 – The 6.4  Imperial Valley earthquake affected Southern California and northern Baja California with a maximum Mercalli intensity of IX (Violent), causing 91 injuries and $30 million in damage.
 October 17 
President Jimmy Carter signs a law establishing the Department of Education.
1979 World Series: The Pittsburgh Pirates defeat the Baltimore Orioles, 4 games to 3, to win their 5th World Series Title.

November
 November 1 – Iran hostage crisis: Iranian Ayatollah Ruhollah Khomeini urges his people to demonstrate on November 4 and to expand attacks on United States and Israeli interests.
 November 2 – Assata Shakur (ne' Joanne Chesimard), a former member of Black Panther Party and Black Liberation Army, is liberated from a Clinton, New Jersey prison and soon shuttled off to Cuba where she remains under political asylum.
 November 3 – Greensboro massacre in Greensboro, North Carolina, five members of the Communist Workers Party are shot to death and seven are wounded by a group of Klansmen and neo-Nazis, during a "Death to the Klan" rally.
 November 4 – Iran hostage crisis begins: 3,000 Iranian radicals, mostly students, invade the U.S. Embassy in Tehran and take 90 hostages (53 of whom are American). They demand that the United States send the former Shah of Iran back to stand trial.
 November 6 – Kentucky Fried Chicken magnate and former Boston Celtics owner John Y. Brown Jr. is elected Governor of Kentucky. 
 November 7 – U.S. Senator Ted Kennedy announces that he will challenge President Jimmy Carter for the 1980 Democratic presidential nomination.
 November 9 – Nuclear false alarm: the NORAD computers and the Alternate National Military Command Center in Fort Ritchie, Maryland detected purported massive Soviet nuclear strike. After reviewing the raw data from satellites and checking the early warning radars, the alert was cancelled.
 November 12 – Iran hostage crisis: In response to the hostage situation in Tehran, U.S. President Jimmy Carter orders a halt to all oil imports into the United States from Iran.
 November 14 – Iran hostage crisis: U.S. President Jimmy Carter issues Executive Order 12170, freezing all Iranian assets in the United States and U.S. banks in response to the hostage crisis.
 November 17 – Iran hostage crisis: Iranian leader Ruhollah Khomeini orders the release of 13 female and African American hostages being held at the U.S. Embassy in Tehran.
 November 21 – After false radio reports from the Ayatollah Khomeini that the Americans had occupied the Grand Mosque in Mecca, the United States Embassy in Islamabad, Pakistan is attacked by a mob and set afire, killing four (see Foreign relations of Pakistan).

December
 December 3 
Eleven fans are killed during a stampede for seats before a The Who concert at the Riverfront Coliseum in Cincinnati, Ohio.
The United States dollar exchange rate with the Deutsche Mark falls to 1.7079 DM, the all-time low so far; this record is not broken until November 5, 1987.
 December 6 – The world premiere for Star Trek: The Motion Picture is held at the Smithsonian Institution in Washington, D.C.
 December 8 – U.S. Representative David C. Treen is elected Governor of Louisiana, becoming Louisiana's first Republican Governor in over 100 years. 
 December 21 – Chrysler receives government loan guarantees upon the request of CEO Lee Iacocca.

Undated
North American Communications direct mail service provider is founded.
Railcar Management LLC, an independent provider of rail transport information services is founded in Atlanta.

December 1, 1978 to February 28, 1979
Except for normally frigid upstate Maine, all of the United States was below average for the winter, an occurrence previously seen only in 1898/1899 and 1909/1910.

Ongoing
 Cold War (1947–1991)
 Détente (c. 1969–1979)
 1970s energy crisis (1973–1980)
 Iran hostage crisis (1979–1981)

Births

January

 January 1 – Ian Fowles, guitarist
 January 2
 Micah Albert, photojournalist
 Erica Hubbard, actress
 January 6 – Cristela Alonzo, actress and comedian
 January 7 – Reggie Austin, actor
 January 8
 Melvin Carter, politician, mayor of St. Paul, Minnesota
 Windell Middlebrooks, actor (d. 2015)
 January 9
 Jake Shields, mixed martial artist
 Joshua Harto, actor
 January 11
 Wyatt Allen, Olympic rower
 Terence Morris, basketball player
 Jeanne Sagan, bassist for Crossing Rubicon, All That Remains (2006–2015), and The Acacia Strain (2003)
 January 13 – Nick Agallar, mixed martial artist
 January 14
 Chris Albright, soccer player
 Angela Lindvall, model
 January 15 – Drew Brees, football player
 January 16 – Aaliyah, R&B singer/actress (d. 2001)
 January 19
 Coral Smith, television personality
 Spider Loc, rapper and actor
 January 20 – Rob Bourdon, drummer for Linkin Park
 January 22 – Saheed Aderinto, Nigerian-born professor and historian
 January 23 – Larry Hughes, basketball player
 January 24
 Tatyana Ali, actress
 Kyle Brandt, actor and television personality
 January 25
 Sheila Cherfilus-McCormick, politician
 Christine Lakin, actress
 January 26
 Natasha Cornett, criminal sentenced to life imprisonment for the Lillelid murders
 Sara Rue, actress
 January 29
 B. J. Flores, boxer
 April Scott, model, actress, and producer
 January 30 – Jorge Alves, ice hockey player
 January 31 – Melanie Stansbury, politician

February

 February 1
 Julie and Nancy Augustyniak Goffi, soccer players and twin sisters
 February 2 – Mayer Hawthorne, soul singer
 February 4
 Rebecca Alexander, psychotherapist and author
 Andrei Arlovski, Belarusian-born mixed martial artist
 Tabitha Brown, actress
 Ben Lerner, writer
 Jodi Shilling, actress
 February 5 – Gil McKinney, actor
 February 7
 Andy Akiho, composer
 Dan Kaminsky, computer security expert (d. 2021)
 Cerina Vincent, actress and writer
 February 8
 Emmanuel Akah, British-born football player
 Josh Keaton, actor
 February 10 – Paul Waggoner, guitarist for Between the Buried and Me
 February 11 – Brandy Norwood, singer and actress
 February 12 – Antonio Chatman, football player
 February 13
 D'Angelo 'D Roc' Holmes, rapper and member of Ying Yang Twins
 Mena Suvari, American actress
 February 17
 Eva Gardner, bassist for The Mars Volta
 Conrad Ricamora, actor and singer
 Josh Willingham, baseball player
 February 21 
 Tituss Burgess, actor and singer
 Chris Hayes, journalist
 Jennifer Love Hewitt, actress and singer
 Jordan Peele, actor, comedian, writer, director, and producer
 February 23
 Chris Aguila, baseball player
 S. E. Cupp, journalist and author
 February 25 – Jennifer Ferrin, actress
 February 28 – Geoffrey Arend, actor

March

 March 1
 Kate Bolz, politician
 Éowyn, singer-songwriter
 March 5 – Riki Lindhome, actress, comedian and musician
 March 6
 Khalid Abdullah, football player
 X1, rapper (d. 2007)
 March 7 – Julia DeMato, singer
 March 8
 Apathy, rapper
 Geoff Rickly singer/songwriter and frontman for Thursday
 March 9
 Oscar Isaac, Guatemalan-born actor
 Melina Perez, wrestler
 March 10
 Josh Altman, real estate agent, investor, and television personality
 Danny Pudi, actor and comedian
 Jimmy Williams, football player (d. 2022)
 March 11
 Alex Aragon, golfer
 Benji Madden, singer and guitarist for Good Charlotte
 Joel Madden, singer and frontman for Good Charlotte
 Justin Wilson, politician, mayor of Alexandria, Virginia
 March 14
 Dan Avidan, musician/Youtuber
 Chris Klein, actor
 March 15
 Jason Crow, politician
 Pollyanna McIntosh, Scottish-born actress
 Kevin Youkilis, baseball player
 March 16
 Tyler Arnason, ice hockey player
 Felisha Terrell, actress
 March 17
 Coco Austin, television personality and actress
 Samoa Joe, wrestler
 March 18
 Danneel Ackles, actress and model
 Adam Levine, singer and frontman for Maroon 5
 March 19 – Josh Gallion, politician
 March 20
 Daniel Cormier, mixed martial artist
 Molly Jenson, musician
 Bianca Lawson, actress
 March 21 – Jimenez Lai, architect
 March 23
 Mark Buehrle, baseball player
 Bryan Fletcher, football player
 March 24 – Adam Andretti, stock car racing driver
 March 25
 Lee Pace, actor
 Traxamillion, producer and rapper (d. 2022)
 Gorilla Zoe, rapper
 March 27
 Mac Schneider, politician
 Robert Teet, wrestler
 March 28 – Rayshawn Askew, football player
 March 29 – De'Angelo Wilson, actor and rapper
 March 30
 Norah Jones, musician
 Jose Pablo Cantillo, actor
 March 31 – Ken Floyd, drummer for Eighteen Visions (1995-2007)

April

 April 2
 Derick Armstrong, football player
 Jesse Carmichael, keyboard player for Maroon 5
 April 4 – Natasha Lyonne, actress
 April 6 – Clay Travis, writer, lawyer, radio host, and television analyst
 April 8 – David Petruschin, drag queen
 April 9 – Keshia Knight Pulliam, actress
 April 10 – Rachel Corrie, activist and diarist (d. 2003)
 April 11 – Josh Server, actor
 April 12
 Claire Danes, actress
 Jennifer Morrison, actress
 April 13 – Baron Davis, basketball player
 April 14 – Rebecca DiPietro, model
 April 15 – Anthony Grundy, basketball player (d. 2019)
 April 17 – Jamel Ashley, sprinter
 April 18
 Michael Bradley, basketball player
 Kourtney Kardashian, reality television star
 Frank LaRose, politician
 April 19
 Chad Anderson, politician
 Kate Hudson, actress, author and fashion designer
 April 21 – Anwar Robinson, singer
 April 23 – Jaime King, actress
 April 24
 Adam Andretti, race car driver
 Avey Tare, musician
 April 25
 Giuseppe Andrews, actor, screenwriter, director, and singer/songwriter
 Khalid El-Amin, basketball player
 April 26 – Joanne Aluka, basketball player
 April 27 – Travis Meeks, frontman and guitarist for Days of the New
 April 29 – Diego Ayala, tennis player
 April 30
 Shelley Calene-Black, voice actress
 Sean Mackin, violinist for Yellowcard

May

 May 4
 Bárbara Almaraz, American-born Mexican soccer player
 Lance Bass, singer and member of 'N Sync
 Zach Nunn, politician
 May 5 – Vincent Kartheiser, actor
 May 6 – Mark Burrier, cartoonist
 May 9
 Aaron Alexis, spree killer (d. 2013)
 Rosario Dawson, actress, singer, producer, comic book writer and political activist
 Matt Morris, American singer-songwriter and actor
 Brandon Webb, American baseball player
 Andrew W.K., singer-songwriter, producer, and actor
 May 12 
 Andre Carter, American football player
 Steve Smith Sr., American football player
 Aaron Yoo, actor
 May 13 – Mickey Madden, bassist for Maroon 5
 May 14 – Dan Auerbach, singer/songwriter, record producer, and frontman for The Black Keys
 May 16
 Brandon Lee, Filipino-born gay pornographic film actor 
 Jessica Morris, actress
 May 22
 Maggie Q, actress
 Nazanin Boniadi, Iranian-born British-American actress
 May 23 – Matt Flynn, drummer for Maroon 5
 May 24
 Greg Amsinger, sportscaster
 Frank Mir, mixed martial artist
 Tracy McGrady, basketball player
 May 25
 Corbin Allred, actor
 Felix G. Arroyo, politician
 May 26
 Marques Anderson, football player
 Elisabeth Harnois, actress
 Ashley Massaro, wrestler and model (d. 2019)
 May 27 – Michael Buonauro, comic creator
 May 28 – Jesse Bradford, actor
 May 29 – Brian Kendrick, wrestler
 May 30
 Brett Anderson, singer and vocalist for The Donnas
 Clint Bowyer, race car driver

June

 June 2
 Imran Awan, Pakistani-born cricketer
 Morena Baccarin, Brazilian-born actress
 Dallas Clark, football player
 June 5
 Mark Anelli, football player
 Pete Wentz, musician, lyricist and bassist for Fall Out Boy
 June 6
 Jeremy Affeldt, baseball player
 Paul Amorese, drummer
 Shanda Sharer, murder victim (d. 1992)
 June 8
 Lauren K. Alleyne, Trinidadian-born poet and writer
 Rob Holliday, singer/songwriter and bass player 
 Derek Trucks, guitarist and songwriter
 June 9 – Jason Anderson, baseball player
 June 10
 Lee Brice, country music singer/songwriter
 Francys Johnson, civil rights attorney, pastor, educator, and political candidate
 June 13 – Cory Aldridge, baseball player
 June 14
 Alton Sterling, victim of police shooting (d. 2016)
 Roosh V, pickup artist, blogger, MGTOW activist, and writer
 June 16 – Ari Hest, singer/songwriter
 June 17
 Tyson Apostol, television personality
 Young Maylay, actor, record producer, and rapper
 June 19
 Pete Aguilar, politician
 Josh Brecheen, politician
 Jade Cole, fashion model
 Quentin Jammer, football player
 June 21 – Chris Pratt, actor
 June 22
 Brad Hawpe, baseball player
 Jai Rodriguez, actor and musician
 June 23
 Ryan Clark, singer and frontman for Demon Hunter
 LaDainian Tomlinson, football player
 June 24 – Mindy Kaling, actress, comedian and author
 June 25
 La La Anthony, television personality and actress
 Busy Philipps, film actress
 June 26 – Ryan Tedder, singer and frontman for OneRepublic
 June 27
 Cazwell, rapper and songwriter
 Scott Taylor, politician and Navy SEAL
 June 28
 Felicia Day, actress, writer, director, violinist, and singer
 Tim McCord, bassist and guitarist for Evanescence and The Revolution Smile (2000-2004)
 Randy McMichael, football player
 June 30
 Rick Gonzalez, actor
 Faisal Shahzad, Pakistani-born bomber
 Matisyahu, reggae vocalist, beatboxer, and alternative rock musician

July

 July 1 – Forrest Griffin, mixed martial artist
 July 2
 Sam Hornish Jr., race car driver
 Ayiesha Woods, singer
 July 4
 Kevin Thoms, actor and voice actor
 Ben Walsh, politician, mayor of Syracuse, New York
 July 6
 Matthew Barnson, viola player and composer
 Kevin Hart, American actor, comedian, writer and producer
 July 7
 Robert Atkins, comic artist
 Pat Barry, kickboxer and mixed martial artist
 July 8 – Ben Jelen, Scottish-born singer/songwriter
 July 12
 Ryan Anderson, baseball player
 Otis Anthony II, politician
 Justin Rockefeller, venture capitalist and political activist
 July 14 – Scott Porter, actor and singer
 July 15
 Laura Benanti, actress and singer
 Philipp Karner, actor, writer and director
 July 16
 Jim Banks, politician
 Jayma Mays, actress and singer
 Kim Rhode, Olympic double trap and skeet shooter
 July 17
 Damien Anderson, football player
 Brendan James, piano-based singer/songwriter
 Mike Vogel, actor
 July 18
 Rick Baxter, politician
 Jason Weaver, actor and singer
 July 19 – Rick Ankiel, baseball player
 July 21 – David Carr, football player
 July 22 – Parvesh Cheena, actor
 July 23 
 Michelle Williams, singer and actress
 Joal Stanfield, tennis coach and educator (d. 2014)
 Peter Rosenberg, radio and WWE personality
 July 24 – Stat Quo, rapper
 July 26
 Tamyra Gray, singer
 Mageina Tovah, actress
 July 27 – Shannon Moore, wrestler
 July 29 – James Lynch, musician, guitarist, and vocalist for Dropkick Murphys
 July 30 – Joseph Afful, Ghanaian-born soccer player
 July 31 – B. J. Novak, actor, director, and producer

August

 August 1
 Romie Adanza, Muay Thai kickboxer
 Jason Momoa, actor
 August 4 – Edward Byers, Navy SEAL and Medal of Honor recipient
 August 7
 Omar Bah, Gambian-born psychologist, author, journalist, refugee, and global survivor
 Gangsta Boo, rapper for Three 6 Mafia (d. 2023)
 Jamey Jasta, singer/songwriter and frontman for Hatebreed and Kingdom of Sorrow
 Abigail Spanberger, politician
 August 8 – William Avery, basketball player
 August 10
 JoAnna Garcia, actress
 Ted Geoghegan, screenwriter
 August 11 – Bubba Crosby, baseball player
 August 12 – Peter Browngardt, cartoonist
 August 15
 Carl Edwards, race car driver
 Matt Pinnell, politician, 17th Lieutenant Governor of Oklahoma
 Peter Shukoff, comedian, musician and personality
 August 19
 Jen Adams, lacrosse player and coach
 Dave Douglas, singer/songwriter and drummer
 August 22
 Brandon Adams, actor
 Matt Walters, football player
 August 24
 Kaki King, guitarist and composer
 Michael Redd, basketball player
 August 25
 Curtis Allgier, white supremacist and convicted murderer
 Andrew Hussie, artist
 August 26
 Erik Apple, mixed martial artist
 James Hart, singer and frontman for Eighteen Visions
 Jamal Lewis, football player
 August 27
 Giovanni Capitello, filmmaker and actor
 Aaron Paul, actor
 August 28 – Shane Van Dyke, actor
 August 29 – Nick Freitas, politician
 August 31 – Mickie James, wrestler

September

 September 4 – Max Greenfield, actor
 September 5 – Kelly Tshibaka, politician
 September 6 – Brandon Silvestry, wrestler
 September 8 – Pink, singer
 September 11
 Steve Hofstetter, comedian, journalist, and author
 Ariana Richards, actress
 Cameron Richardson, actress and model
 September 12
 Michelle Dorrance, tap dancer
 Jay McGraw, author, son of TV psychologist Dr. Phil McGraw
 September 15
 Dave Annable, actor
 Amy Davidson, actress
 September 16 – Flo Rida, rapper
 September 17 – Akin Ayodele, football player
 September 18
 Jason Armstead, football player
 Alison Lohman, actress
 Amna Nawaz, journalist
 September 20 – Ryan Fleck, filmmaker
 September 21
 Bradford Anderson, actor
 Mark Burns, evangelical minister, televangelist, conspiracy theorist, and political candidate
 September 22
 Emilie Autumn, singer/songwriter, poet, author, and violinist
 Swin Cash, basketball player
 Peggy Flanagan, politician, 50th Lieutenant Governor of Minnesota
 September 24
 Justin Bruening, actor and model
 Erin Chambers, actress
 Ross Matthews, television host and personality
 September 25 – Rashad Evans, mixed martial artist
 September 26
 Lanie Alabanza-Barcena, fashion designer
 Christina Nolan, politician
 September 28
 Bam Margera, skateboarder, actor, and reality star
 Anndi McAfee, actress and voice actress
 September 30
 Mike Damus, actor
 Steve Klein, songwriter and guitarist for New Found Glory (1997-2014)

October

 October 1
 Curtis Axel, wrestler
 Rudi Johnson, football player
 October 2 – Brianna Brown, actress
 October 3
 Matt Davis, comedian
 Josh Klinghoffer, musician and guitarist for Red Hot Chili Peppers
 John Hennigan, wrestler
 October 4
 Brandon Barash, actor
 Rachael Leigh Cook, actress
 October 8 – Kristanna Loken, actress and model
 October 9
 Vernon Fox, football player
 Alex Greenwald, producer, actor, and singer/songwriter for Phantom Planet and JJAMZ
 DJ Rashad, electronic musician, producer, and DJ (d. 2014)
 Brandon Routh, actor
 October 10 – Mýa, singer and actress
 October 11 – Gabe Saporta, Uruguayan-born singer, frontman for Cobra Starship (2016-2015) and Midtown
 October 12 – Jordan Pundik, singer/songwriter and frontman for New Found Glory
 October 14 – Stacy Keibler, wrestler, actress, and model
 October 15
 Blue Adams, football player
 Jaci Velasquez, Christian singer
 October 16
 Andre J., entertainer and party promoter
 Erin Brown, actress
 October 18 – Ne-Yo, singer/songwriter
 October 19 – Habib Azar, director
 October 20
 Junior Adams, football player and coach
 Nika Agiashvili, Georgian-born writer and producer
 Anna Boden, filmmaker 
 John Krasinski, actor
 October 22 – DJ Abilities, hip hop producer
 October 23 – Charlie Adams, football player
 October 25 – Sarah Thompson, actress
 October 26
 Jonathan Chase, actor
 Josh Portman, bassist for Yellowcard
 October 28
 Brett Dennen, folk/pop singer/songwriter 
 Glover Teixeira, Brazilian-born mixed martial artist
 Jawed Karim, German-born software engineer, Internet entrepreneur, and co-founder of YouTube
 October 30 – Kristina Anapau, actress and writer
 October 31 – Nicholas Angell, ice hockey player

November

 November 1 – Coco Crisp, baseball player
 November 2 – Erika Flores, actress
 November 3 – Tim McIlrath, rock singer/songwriter and frontman for Rise Against
 November 4
 Trishelle Cannatella, actress, model, and television personality
 Audrey Hollander, porn actress
 November 5 – Jackson Andrews, wrestler
 November 6 – Lamar Odom, basketball player
 November 7
 Quincy Allen, convicted murderer
 Jon Peter Lewis, singer/songwriter
 Joey Ryan, professional wrestler and promoter
 November 8 – Dania Ramirez, Dominican-born actress
 November 9
 Cory Hardrict, actor
 Darren Trumeter, actor and comedian
 November 11 – James Allen, football player
 November 12
 Matt Cappotelli, wrestler (d. 2018)
 Crown J, rapper
 Cote de Pablo, Chilean-born actress
 November 13
 Henry Wolfe, actor and musician
 Metta World Peace, basketball player
 November 15 – Brooks Bollinger, football player and coach
 November 18 – Michael Anestis, clinical psychologist and professor
 November 19
 Keith Buckley, singer and frontman for Every Time I Die and The Damned Things
 Barry Jenkins, film director, producer, and screenwriter
 Larry Johnson, football player
 Michelle Vieth, American-born Mexican actress and model
 November 20 – Ruben Gallego, politician
 November 22 – Keith Adams, football player
 November 23
 Yashar Ali, journalist
 Tim Chiou, actor
 Jonathan Sadowski, actor
 November 24 – Scotty Anderson, football player
 November 25 – Joel Kinnaman, Swedish-born actor
 November 26 – B. J. Averell, actor
 November 27
 Ricky Carmichael, motorcycle and stock car racer
 Hilary Hahn, violinist
 November 28
 Chamillionaire, rapper
 Daniel Henney, actor and model
 November 29 – The Game, rapper
 November 30 – Lisa Aguilera, sprinter

December

 December 2 – Melissa Archer, actress
 December 3
 Rock Cartwright, football player
 Robby Mook, political campaign strategist and campaign manager
 Tiffany Haddish, actress and comedian
 December 5 – Nick Stahl, actor
 December 6 –  Luke Letlow, congressman-elect (d.2020)
 December 7 
 Sara Bareilles, singer/songwriter and pianist
 Jennifer Carpenter, actress
 December 8
 Paul Dalio, filmmaker and mental health advocate
 Ingrid Michaelson, American indie pop singer-songwriter
 December 12 – Garrett Atkins, baseball player
 December 11 – Rider Strong, actor
 December 14
 Tony Arnerich, baseball coach
 Chris Cheng, sport shooter
 December 15 – Adam Brody, actor
 December 16 – Brodie Lee, wrestler and actor (d. 2020)
 December 17
 40 Cal., rapper
 Jaimee Foxworth, actress and model
 William Green, football player
 Ryan Key, singer/songwriter, rhythm guitarist, and frontman for Yellowcard
 Matt Murley, hockey player
 December 18 – Amy Grabow, actress
 December 19
 Chip Ambres, baseball player
 Kevin Devine, songwriter and musician
 December 20 – David DeJesus, baseball player
 December 21 – Rutina Wesley, actress
 December 22
 Amanda Baker, actress
 Liam Wilson, bassist for The Dillinger Escape Plan
 December 23
 Summer Altice, model and actress
 Morgan McGarvey, politician
 December 26
 Angela Angel, politician
 Chris Daughtry, singer and guitarist
 December 27
 Melissa Anelli, author and webmistress
 Carson Palmer, football player
 December 28
 James Blake, tennis pro
 André Holland, actor
 Robert Edward Davis, American-born German rapper
 Zach Hill, drummer for Death Grips
 December 30
 Catherine Taber, voice, film and television actress
 Yelawolf, rapper
 December 31
 Bob Bryar, drummer for My Chemical Romance
 Josh Hawley, politician

Full Date Unknown

 Kim Abbott, politician
 Omid Abtahi, Iranian-born actor
 Amir AghaKouchak, Iranian-born engineer
 Atif Akin, Turkish-born artist
 Matthew Alan, actor
 Bianca Allaine, actress, host, and model
 Linas Alsenas, author and illustrator
 Ashley Altadonna, filmmaker, musician, author, and LGBT activist
 Amateur Gourmet, food writer and blogger
 Kasey Anderson, singer/songwriter, guitarist, producer, and musician
 Meghan Andrews, actress and singer
 Jones Angell, radio announcer
 Lesley Arfin, writer and author
 Dave Atchison, musician
 Brian Avery, anti-war activist

Deaths

January

 January 3 – Conrad Hilton, American hotelier (b. 1887)
 January 5
 Billy Bletcher, American actor (b. 1894)
 Charles Mingus, American musician (b. 1922)
 January 8 – Sara Carter, American singer-songwriter and harp player (b. 1898)
 January 11 – Jack Soo, Japanese-born American actor (b. 1917)
 January 13 – Donny Hathaway, American musician (b. 1945)
 January 14 – Thomas DeSimone, American gangster (b. 1950)
 January 15 – Charles W. Morris, American philosopher and semiotician (b. 1901)
 January 16 – Ted Cassidy, American actor (b. 1932)
 January 26 – Nelson Rockefeller, 41st Vice President of the United States (b. 1908)

February

 February 2 – Sid Vicious, English musician (b. 1957)
 February 9 – Allen Tate, poet and essayist (born 1899)
 February 17 – William Gargan, American actor (b. 1905)

March

 March 1 – Dolores Costello, American actress (b. 1903)
 March 11 – Victor Kilian, American actor (b. 1891)
 March 14 – Will Mastin, American vaudevillian (b. 1878)
 March 18 – Marjorie Daw, American actress (b. 1902)
 March 22 – Ben Lyon, American actor (b. 1901)
 March 26 – Jean Stafford, American writer (b. 1915)
 March 28 – Emmett Kelly, American clown (born 1898)

April
 April 4 – Edgar Buchanan, American actor (b. 1903)
 April 24 – John Carroll, American actor (b. 1906)

May

 May 6 – Milton Ager, American songwriter (b. 1893)
 May 8 – 
 Lillian La France, motorcycle stunt rider.
 Talcott Parsons, American sociologist (b. 1902)
 May 11
 Joan Chandler, American actress (b. 1923)
 Barbara Hutton, American socialite (b. 1912)
 May 16 – A. Philip Randolph, African American labor union leader (b. 1889)
 May 29 – Mary Pickford, Canadian-American actress and producer (b. 1892)

June

 June 1 – Jack Mulhall, American actor (b. 1887)
 June 6 – Jack Haley, American actor (b. 1898)
 June 11
 Loren Murchison, American Olympic athlete (b. 1898)
 John Wayne, American actor and film director (b. 1907)
 June 13 – Darla Hood, American actress (b. 1931)
 June 25 – Dave Fleischer, American animator (b. 1894)

July

 July 4 – Theodora Kroeber, American writer and anthropologist (b. 1897)
 July 6 – Van McCoy, American accomplished musician; noted for his 1975 hit The Hustle (b. 1940)
 July 7 – Morris Talpalar, sociologist (b. 1900)
 July 8
 Elizabeth Ryan, American 30 Grand Slam (tennis) Tennis Champion (b. 1892)
 Robert Burns Woodward, American chemist, Nobel Prize laureate (b. 1917)
 July 10 – Arthur Fiedler, American conductor (Boston Pops) (b. 1894)
 July 12 – Minnie Riperton, American rhythm and blues singer (Lovin' You) (b. 1947)
 July 13 – Corinne Griffith, American actress and author (b. 1894)
 July 28 – George Seaton, American screenwriter and director (b. 1911)
 July 29 – Herbert Marcuse, German-American philosopher, sociologist and political theorist (b. 1898)

August

 August 2 – Thurman Munson, American baseball player (b. 1947) 
 August 9 – Walter O'Malley, American baseball executive (b. 1903)
 August 10 – Dick Foran, American actor (b. 1910)
 August 21 – Stuart Heisler, American film and television director (b. 1896)
 August 22 – James T. Farrell, American novelist (b. 1904)
 August 25 – Stan Kenton, American jazz pianist (b. 1911)
 August 26 – Alvin Karpis, American criminal (b. 1907) 
 August 30 (body found on September 8) – Jean Seberg, American actress (b. 1938)
 August 31 – Sally Rand, American dancer (b. 1904)

September
 September 1 – Doris Kenyon, American actress (b. 1897)
 September 24 – Carl Laemmle Jr., American film studio executive (b. 1908)
 September 26
 John Cromwell, American film director and actor (b. 1887)
 Arthur Hunnicutt, American actor (b. 1910)
 September 29 – Rudy Lavik, sports coach and administrator (b. 1892)

October
 October 1 – Dorothy Arzner, American film director (b. 1897)
 October 6 – Elizabeth Bishop, American poet (b. 1911)
 October 13 – Rebecca Helferich Clarke, British-born viola player and composer, (b. 1886)
 October 15 – Jacob L. Devers, U.S. Army general (b. 1887)
 October 27 – Charles Coughlin, Canadian-American priest (b. 1891)

November

 November 1 – Mamie Eisenhower, 34th First Lady of the United States (b. 1896)
 November 5 – Al Capp, American cartoonist (b. 1909)
 November 9 – Louise Thaden, American aviation pioneer (b. 1905
 November 23 – Judee Sill, American singer and songwriter (b. 1944)
 November 30 – Zeppo Marx, American actor and comedian (b. 1901)

December

 December 7 – Cecilia Payne-Gaposchkin, British-born American astronomer and astrophysicist (b. 1900)
 December 9 – Fulton J. Sheen, American Roman Catholic bishop and venerable (b. 1895) 
 December 10 – Ann Dvorak, actress (b. 1912)
 December 13 – Jon Hall, American actor (b. 1915)
 December 15 – Ethel Lackie, American Olympic swimmer (b. 1907)
 December 16 – Murray Gurfein, judge of the Court of Appeals for the Second Circuit (b. 1907)
 December 22 – Darryl F. Zanuck, American film producer (b. 1902)
 December 23 
 Peggy Guggenheim, American art collector (b. 1898)
 Ernest B. Schoedsack, American film producer and director (b. 1893)
 December 25
 Joan Blondell, American actress (b. 1906)
 Lee Bowman, American actor (b. 1914)
 December 30 – Richard Rodgers, American composer (b. 1902)

See also 
 1979 in American television
 List of American films of 1979
 Timeline of United States history (1970–1989)

Notes

References

External links
 

 
1970s in the United States
United States
United States
Years of the 20th century in the United States